= Wagneripteryx =

Scientific classification
- Domain: Eukaryota
- Kingdom: Animalia
- Phylum: Arthropoda
- Class: Insecta
- Order: Hemiptera
- Suborder: Auchenorrhyncha
- Family: Cicadellidae
- Genus: Wagneripteryx; Dlabola, 1958

Genus of true bugs

Wagneripteryx is a genus of true bugs belonging to the family Cicadellidae.

- Wagneripteryx germari
